Mohammad Kaisar Hamid is a Bangladeshi former soccer player.  He became well known in the 1980s and 1990s as a central defender for Mohammedan Sporting Club in Dhaka's domestic league and in the 1988–89 Asian Club Championship.  He also represented Bangladesh at the national level.  In 2003, he received Bangladesh's National Sports Award.

Club career
After making his debut for Rahmatganj Muslim Friends Society  as a right wing back he moved to MSC,  in 1985 and started playing as a central defender. he had a highly successful time at MSC, as the black and whites won successive league titles in 1986, 1987 and in 1988-89. He along with the likes of Badal Roy, Samrat Hossain Emily, and a few foreign recruits played major parts in this success.  Apart from playing for Dhaka Mohammedan Sporting Club he also had a brief stint with Calcutta Mohammedan in 1991.

International career
He made his debut during the 1984 South Asian Games, in Nepal. While playing as right back in the WC qualifier against Indonesia in 1985 at Dhaka, he scored an equalizing goal for the Bangladesh team with a powerful header. left winger Chunnu later scored the winner from a free kick in a 21 victory. This was Bangladesh 's first ever victory in a WC qualifier. In 1989, he was a member of the Bangladesh  (Red) team that won the President's Cup in Dhaka beating a South Korean team in tie  breakers in the final.

International goals
Scores and results list Bangladesh's goal tally first.

Family and personal life
Kaiser Hamid's mother Rani Hamid is a chess player. She is the first FIDE Woman International Master in the history of Bangladesh. While his father MA Hamid was the founder of the Bangladesh Handball Federation, the president of the Army Sports Control Board. Kaiser's older brother, Sohel Hamid, was a national squash champion and the youngest brother, Bobby Hamid, was a football player for Wari Club in the Dhaka League, during the 90s. Kaiser studied in University of Dhaka.

Hamid is married to Lopa Kaisar. His daughter, Kaarina Kaisar, is a comedian.

Soon after retiring from football in the early 90s, Kaiser entered politics. He ran on a Zaker Party ticket in the national elections. In 2008, he was sued for attempted murder having reportedly hit a doctor of a state-owned hospital on the head with a pistol. Kaiser was amidst controversy once more, when he was again arrested for embezzling investor funds, in 2019.

References

Living people
1968 births
People from Sylhet
Bangladeshi footballers
Bangladesh international footballers
Association football central defenders
Asian Games competitors for Bangladesh
Footballers at the 1986 Asian Games
Footballers at the 1990 Asian Games
Rahmatganj MFS players
Team BJMC players
Mohammedan SC (Dhaka) players
Mohammedan SC (Kolkata) players
Bangladeshi expatriate sportspeople in India
Expatriate footballers in India
Calcutta Football League players
South Asian Games medalists in football
South Asian Games silver medalists for Bangladesh
Recipients of the Bangladesh National Sports Award